Timothy Mixon (born July 8, 1984 in Compton, California) is a former American football cornerback. He was originally signed by the Seattle Seahawks as an undrafted free agent in 2007. He played college football at California.

Mixon was also a member of the Chicago Bears, Cleveland Browns and New England Patriots.

Early years
He played high school football at Dominguez High School in Compton.

External links
California Golden Bears bio
New England Patriots bio

1984 births
Living people
Players of American football from Compton, California
American football cornerbacks
California Golden Bears football players
Seattle Seahawks players
Chicago Bears players
Cleveland Browns players
New England Patriots players